Jack Cobden (born 26 March 1989) is an England-born Romanian rugby union player. His regular position is winger.

Career
He started his career at Leicester Tigers. He played for England U16, U18 and U20. In 2009, he moved to Nottingham RFC, in RFU Championship. He joined Romanian SuperLiga side CSM Olimpia București in 2013.

Jack also plays for Romania's national team, the Oaks, making his international debut at the 2017 Rugby Europe Championship in a match against Belgium where he scored two tries with his first two touches.

References

External links
 
 
 
 

1989 births
Living people
CSM București (rugby union) players
English expatriate rugby union players
English expatriate sportspeople in Romania
English rugby union players
Leicester Tigers players
Nottingham R.F.C. players
Romania international rugby union players
Rugby union players from Staffordshire
Rugby union wings